The A. Chapin House is a historic house located at 36 Pleasant Street, in Uxbridge, Massachusetts.

Description and history 
It is a -story wood-framed structure, with a front-facing gable roof and clapboard siding. The building corners are pilastered, and it has a wide cornice. The front entry is flanked by sidelight windows and pilasters. The house was built c. 1855-57 as a typical Greek Revival side hall entry house. It was restyled in 1880, adding significant Gothic Revival styling, including an ornately decorated porch. Little is known about most of its owners, including A. Chapin, its first documented owner (1857).

On October 7, 1983, it was added to the National Register of Historic Places, where it is listed at 26 Pleasant Street.

See also
National Register of Historic Places listings in Uxbridge, Massachusetts

References

Houses completed in 1855
Houses in Uxbridge, Massachusetts
National Register of Historic Places in Uxbridge, Massachusetts
Houses on the National Register of Historic Places in Worcester County, Massachusetts
Greek Revival houses in Massachusetts
Gothic Revival architecture in Massachusetts